Yeylan-e Jonubi Rural District is a rural district (dehestan) in Bolbanabad District, Dehgolan County, Kurdistan Province, Iran. At the 2006 census, its population was 6,764, in 1,524 families. The rural district has 14 villages.

References 

Rural Districts of Kurdistan Province
Dehgolan County